The Alessandria–Piacenza railway is a railway located in northern Italy connecting the regions of Emilia-Romagna, Lombardy, and Piedmont. It links the rail hub of Alessandria with that of Piacenza, passing through the cities of Tortona, Voghera, and Stradella.

History 
 
The works for the construction of the railway began on 16 January 1856: the initial project included the section between Alessandria and Stradella, as well as a branch from Tortona to Novi Ligure. In June 1858 a decree was approved by the Chamber for the Facilitazione per l'unione della Società della ferrovia da Alessandria e Novi a Stradella con quella di Piacenza (Facilitation of the union of the railway company from Alessandria and Novi to Stradella with that of Piacenza) In 1859, the territory of the Duchy of Parma and Piacenza were incorporated into the United Provinces of Central Italy and subsequently annexed to the Kingdom of Sardinia as a result of the plebiscite of 12 March 1860. Following the annexation, the railway was extended to Piacenza.
 

 
The first section, between Alessandria and Casteggio was opened on 25 January 1858. The section was opened to Stradella in the following July, while the Piacenza sections of the line were opened between 1859 and 1860, the last of which, between the bridge over the Trebbia river and Piacenza, was opened to traffic on 19 January 1860.
 
Starting from 1 July 1905, under law no.137 of 22 April 1905, the operation of the railway line was taken over by the Italian state, through the newly established Azienda autonoma per l'esercizio delle Ferrovie Italiane (Ferrovie dello Stato), under the control of the Ministry of Public Works.
 

Characteristics 
The railway has a gauge of 1435 mm. It is electrified at 3000V, and it can bear a weight of 22.5 tons per axis.

References

Footnotes

Sources
 
 
  

Railway lines in Emilia-Romagna
Railway lines in Lombardy
Railway lines in Piedmont
Railway lines opened in 1858